Top Model po-russki (Топ-модель по-русски) is a Russian reality television show and the second Russian adaptation of Tyra Banks' America's Next Top Model, after You are a Supermodel, which aired from 2004 to 2007. The show sees a number of aspiring models compete against each other in a variety of challenges to win the title of the next Top Model  of Russia, along with a lucrative modelling contract and other prizes in the hope of a successful career in the modeling industry.

On November 30, 2012, it was announced that Top model po-russki had been cancelled after four cycles. After a one-year hiatus, the show returned with a fifth cycle in 2014.

Judges
For the first three cycles the competition was hosted by Ksenia Sobchak. The judging panel of the first cycle were Sobchak, model Inna Zobova, fashion designer Elena Suprun and photographer Mikhail Korolev. For cycle 2, Suprun and Korolev left the show and were replaced by male model Danila POlyakov and stylist, fashion designer & TV presenter Vlad Lisovets. For cycle 4 the entire panel was revamped. The other members of the judging panel were J. Alexander, Tess Feuilhade, and Vincent McDoom. For cycle 5, Lisovets and Sobchak returned to the show as judges, joined by new judge Denis Simachev, and new host Natalya Stefanenko, who previously hosted the Italian version of the show during its four-year run.

Cycles

References

External links
Season 1-3 Official Website
Season 4-5 Official Website

Top Model series (Russia)
2011 Russian television series debuts
2012 Russian television series endings
2010s Russian television series
Russian television series based on American television series